The Parish of St. Anne in Poznań, erected in 1948, is a Roman Catholic parish belonging to the Poznań-Lazarus deanery of Poznań Archdiocese in Poznań, Poland. It is located on 13 Limanowskiego Street in Poznań's St. Lazarus.

History 
Before World War II, evangelical Germans in Poznań lacked facilities for worship even though they were a significant part of the population (approx. 30 percent), while Catholic residents of Poznań Lazarus worshipped at the Parish of Our Lady of Sorrows. Therefore, between 1904 and 1907, a temple was built for the Protestants dedicated to Christ (Christuskirche). It served the German community well until after World War II when large numbers of the German population left the city.

In 1945 the church was designated for Catholic services. Pastoral ministry was performed by priests from the nearby parish church, St. Michael the Archangel. On April 1, 1948, Archbishop Walenty Dymek issued a decree creating a new St. Anne Parish. The first pastor was Rev. Tadeusz Nowakowski, former administrator of the Parish of St. Michael.

The church underwent its first renovation after an initiative to change the interior to match the Catholic liturgy requirements. In 1956, a team led by Prof. Wacław Taranczewski commissioned murals to be completed in the sanctuary. In subsequent years, a rectory and a parish house were also added. In 1988, the state authorities formally transferred the buildings and land to the ownership of the parish.

Present day 
Currently, the Parish includes the territory from the northern part of Lazarus (north from Sczanieckiej Street and Rynek Łazarski Market Square). The priest in charge (since 2010) is Rev. Fr. Marek Balcer. Parish work includes The Parish Caritas Team Living Rosary, The Senior Club, The Knights of the Immaculata, and Home Church.

References

External links 
 

Churches in Poznań
Roman Catholic churches completed in 1907
20th-century churches in Poland